The National Association of Small Farmers (ANAP) is a cooperative federation dedicated to promoting the interests of small farmers in Cuba. ANAP has over 300,000 members.

History
ANAP was formed in 1961 and its membership was limited to farmers whose land holdings were less than 67 hectares. The Cuban government supported ANAP by providing interest-free loans to its members. Second Agrarian Reform Law of October 1963, introduced the State control over medium and large (over 67 hectares) agricultural estates. While medium and large farms accounting 11.4 million hectares of land were put under control of the newly created State-controlled National Land Reform Institute (INRA), small farmers, owning 7.2 million hectares of land, were organized in ANAP association.

In 1966 together with the Federation of Cuban Women (FMC) the FMC-ANAP Mutual Aid Brigades were established aiming to help rural women become more economically active outside the home. FMC-ANAP brigades increased available rural labour force at critical moments in the agricultural cycle, and were instrumental in the campaign to increase the sugarcane harvest in Cuba

In 1977 ANAP supported the gradual transformation of the private sector. Individual farmers were endorsed to voluntarily join production co-operatives. By 1987 co-operative farms were accounting for 63% of private land holdings. Altogether 1,400 co-operative farms had 68,000 co-operative members.

Currently ANAP members produce 52% of the vegetables, 67% of the corn, and 85% of the tobacco grown in Cuba

Activities

ANAP provides training, agricultural extension and other services to its members. Federation often negotiates with Cuban government on prices of agricultural production, credits, and other farmers' interests.

Internationally ANAP cooperates with NGOs, mainly from Canada and Europe. In 1995 the Cuban Organic Agriculture Exchange Program was started in cooperation with the US organization the Institute for Food and Development Policy.

See also 
Agriculture in Cuba

References 

Agricultural organizations based in Cuba
Cuban farmers
Farmers' organizations
1960s in Cuba
1961 establishments in Cuba
Organizations established in 1961